Holly Crawford (born 10 February 1984) is an Australian half-pipe snowboarder. She competed in the 2006 Winter Olympics and placed 22nd and 12th in her qualification runs. She ranked 19th out of 34 competitors and did not make the final. Crawford also competed in the 2010 Winter Olympics and finished 8th in the final having qualified 1st in the semifinals. She missed out on direct qualification to the final by one place, finishing 7th in the qualifying round.

She won a silver medal in halfpipe at 2013 FIS Snowboarding World Championships, behind American Arielle Gold.

She competed for Australia at the 2014 Winter Olympics in the snowboarding events.

In December 2016, Crawford was named to Australia's team for the 2017 Asian Winter Games in Sapporo, Japan.

References

External links
 
 
 
 

1984 births
Australian female snowboarders
Olympic snowboarders of Australia
Snowboarders at the 2006 Winter Olympics
Snowboarders at the 2010 Winter Olympics
Snowboarders at the 2014 Winter Olympics
Snowboarders at the 2018 Winter Olympics
Living people
Sportspeople from Sydney
Snowboarders at the 2017 Asian Winter Games
21st-century Australian women